Craugastor polymniae is a species of frog in the family Craugastoridae.
It is endemic to Mexico.
Its natural habitat is subtropical or tropical moist montane forests.
It is threatened by habitat loss.

References

polymniae
Endemic amphibians of Mexico
Natural history of Oaxaca
Fauna of the Sierra Madre de Oaxaca
Amphibians described in 1989
Taxonomy articles created by Polbot